Eric Moncur (born November 28, 1984) is a former American football defensive end. He was signed by the Philadelphia Eagles as an undrafted free agent in 2010. He played college football at Miami (Fla.). He is now a highschool football coach for Mater Academy charter highschool in Hialeah Florida.

Moncur also played for the Sacramento Mountain Lions.

Early years
Moncur attended Miami Carol City High School in Miami Gardens, Florida.

College career
Moncur played college football at the University of Miami. He earned The Sporting News freshman All-ACC honors in 2005.

Professional career

Philadelphia Eagles
Moncur was signed by the Philadelphia Eagles as an undrafted free agent following the 2010 NFL Draft on April 27, 2010. He was waived on August 2. He was re-signed on August 16. He was waived during final cuts on September 4.

References

External links
Just Sports Stats
Philadelphia Eagles bio

1984 births
Living people
Miami Carol City Senior High School alumni
Players of American football from Miami
American football defensive ends
Miami Hurricanes football players
Philadelphia Eagles players
Sacramento Mountain Lions players